The 2011 New Zealand general election took place on Saturday 26 November 2011 to determine the membership of the 50th New Zealand Parliament.

One hundred and twenty-one MPs were elected to the New Zealand House of Representatives, 70 from single-member electorates, and 51 from party lists including one overhang seat. New Zealand since 1996 has used the Mixed Member Proportional (MMP) voting system, giving voters two votes: one for a political party and the other for their local electorate MP. A referendum on the voting system was held at the same time as the election, with voters voting by majority to keep the MMP system.

A total of 3,070,847 people were registered to vote in the election, with over 2.2 million votes cast and a turnout of 74.21% – the lowest turnout since 1887. The incumbent National Party, led by John Key, gained the plurality with 47.3% of the party vote and 59 seats, two seats short of holding a majority. The opposing Labour Party, led by Phil Goff, lost ground winning 27.5% of the vote and 34 seats, while the Green Party won 11.1% of the vote and 14 seats – the biggest share of the party vote for a minor party since 1996. New Zealand First, having won no seats in 2008 due to its failure to either reach the 5% threshold or win an electorate, made a comeback with 6.6% of the vote entitling them to eight seats.

National's confidence and supply partners in the 49th Parliament meanwhile suffered losses. ACT New Zealand won less than a third of the party vote it received in 2008, reducing from five seats to one. The Māori Party was reduced from five seats to three, as the party vote split between the Māori Party and former Māori Party MP Hone Harawira's Mana Party. United Future lost party votes, but retained their one seat in Parliament.

Following the election, National reentered into confidence and supply agreements with ACT and United Future on 5 December 2011, and with the Māori Party on 11 December 2011, to form a minority government with a seven-seat majority (64 seats to 57) and give the Fifth National Government a second term in office.

Background

Election date and other key dates
The election date was set as Saturday 26 November 2011, as predicted by the media. Breaking with tradition, Prime Minister John Key announced the election date in February. Traditionally, the election date is a closely guarded secret, announced as late as possible. The date follows the tradition of holding the general election on the last Saturday of November unless the schedule is interrupted by a snap election or to circumvent holding a by-election.

The Governor-General must issue writs for an election within seven days of the expiration or dissolution of Parliament. Under section 17 of the Constitution Act 1986, Parliament expires three years "from the day fixed for the return of the writs issued for the last preceding general election of members of the House of Representatives, and no longer." The writs for the previous general election were returnable on 27 November 2008. As a result, the 49th Parliament would have expired, if not dissolved earlier, on 27 November 2011. As that day was a Sunday, the last available working day was 25 November 2011. Consequently, the last day for issuance of writs of election was 2 December 2011. Except in some circumstances (such a recount or the death/incapacitation of an electorate candidate), the writs must be returned within 50 days of their issuance with the last possible working day being 20 January 2012. Because polling day must be a Saturday, the last possible polling date for the election was 7 January 2012, allowing time for the counting of special votes. The Christmas/New Year holiday period made the last realistic date for the election Saturday 10 December 2011. The Rugby World Cup 2011 was hosted by New Zealand between 9 September and 23 October 2011, and ruled out all the possible election dates in this period. This left two possible windows for the general election: on or before 2 September and 29 October to 10 December.

Key dates of the election were:

However, as the recount of the Waitakere was not completed in time for the writ to be returned on 15 December, the return of the writ was delayed to 17 December 2011.

49th Parliament, 2008–2011
Following the 2008 general election, National Party leader and Prime Minister John Key announced a confidence and supply agreement with ACT, the Māori Party and United Future to form the Fifth National Government. These arrangements gave the National-led government a majority of 16 seats, with 69 on confidence-and-supply in the 122-seat Parliament.

Labour, Greens and the Progressives are all in opposition, although only the Labour and Progressive parties formally constitute the formal Opposition; the Greens have a minor agreement with the government but are not committed to confidence and supply support.

At the 2008 election, the National Party had 58 seats, the Labour Party 43 seats, Green Party 9 seats, ACT and Māori Party five each, and Progressive and United Future one each. During the Parliament session, two members defected from their parties – Chris Carter was expelled from Labour in August 2010, and Hone Harawira left the Māori Party in February 2011. Carter continued as an independent, while Harawira resigned from parliament to recontest his Te Tai Tokerau electorate in a by-election under his newly formed Mana Party. Two MPs resigned from Parliament before the end of the session, John Carter of National and Chris Carter, but as they resigned within 6 months of an election, their seats remained vacant.

At the dissolution of the 49th parliament on 20 October 2011, National held 57 seats, Labour 42 seats, Green 9 seats, ACT 5 seats, Māori 4 seats, and Progressive, United Future and Mana one each.

Marginal seats in 2008
At the 2008 election, the following seats were won by a majority of less than 1000 votes:

MPs retiring in 2011
Nineteen MPs, including all five ACT MPs and the sole Progressive MP, intended to retire at the end of the 49th Parliament. One of the ACT MPs, John Boscawen, contested Tāmaki, but did not expect to win and was not on the party list. National MP Allan Peachey died three weeks before the election.

Electorate boundaries

Electorates in the election were the same as at the 2008 election.

Electorates and their boundaries in New Zealand are reviewed every five years after the New Zealand census. The last review took place in 2007, following the 2006 census. The next review is not due until 2014, following the 2013 census (the 2011 census was cancelled due to the 22 February 2011 Christchurch earthquake).

Election procedures
On 17 September 2010, Justice Minister Simon Power announced the government was introducing legislation making this the first election where voters would be able to re-enrol completely on-line. Enrolments on-line beforehand still required the election form to be printed, signed, and sent by post.

Voters in the Christchurch region were encouraged to cast their votes before election day if they had doubt about being able to get to a polling booth on election day or to avoid long queues, as many traditional polling booths are unavailable due to the earthquakes. Nineteen advance voting stations were made available, with three of them campervans, which are usually only used in rural areas of New Zealand. The Christchurch Central electorate, for example, has 33 polling stations in 2011 compared to 45 in 2008.

Contesting parties and candidates

At the close of nominations, 544 individuals had been nominated to contest the election, down from 682 at the 2008 election. Of those, 91 were list-only, 73 were electorate-only (43 from registered parties, 17 independents, and 13 from non-registered parties), and 380 contested both list and electorate.

Political parties registered with the Electoral Commission on Writ Day can contest the general election as a party, allowing it to submit a party list to contend the party vote, and have a party election expenses limit in addition to individual candidate limits. At Writ Day, sixteen political parties were registered to contend the general election. At the close of nominations, thirteen registered parties had put forward a party list to the commission to contest the party vote, down from nineteen in 2008.

The Kiwi Party, the New Citizen Party and the Progressive Party were registered, but did not contend the election under their own banners. The Kiwi Party and the New Citizen Party stood candidates for the Conservative Party.

In addition to the registered parties and their candidates, thirteen candidates from nine non-registered parties contested electorates. The Human Rights Party contested Auckland Central, the Communist League Manukau East and Mount Roskill, the Nga Iwi Morehu Movement contested Hauraki-Waikato and Te Tai Hauauru, the Pirate Party contested Hamilton East and Wellington Central, the Sovereignty Party contested Clutha-Southland and Te Tai Hauauru, Economic Euthenics contested Wigram, New Economics contested Wellington Central, Restore All Things In Christ contested Dunedin South, and the Youth Party contested West Coast-Tasman.

Seventeen independent candidates also contested the electorates in thirteen electorates: Christchurch Central, Coromandel, Epsom (two), Hamilton West (two), New Plymouth, Ōtaki, Rangitikei (two), Rongotai, Tāmaki (two), Tauranga, Waitaki, Wellington Central, and Ikaroa-Rawhiti

Campaigning

Epsom and the Tea Tape scandal

On 11 November, National Party leader John Key met with John Banks, the ACT candidate for Epsom, over a cup of tea at a cafe in Newmarket to send a signal to Epsom voters about voting tactically. The National Party passively campaigned for Epsom voters to give their electorate vote to ACT while giving their party vote to National. This would allow ACT to bypass the 5% party vote threshold and enter Parliament by winning an electorate seat, thereby providing a coalition partner for National. However, in October and November 2011, polls of the Epsom electorate vote taken by various companies showed that the National candidate for Epsom, Paul Goldsmith, was leading in the polls and likely to win the seat. During the meeting, the two politicians' discussion was recorded by a device left on the table in a black pouch. The recording tapes were leaked to The Herald on Sunday newspaper, and subsequently created a media frenzy over the content of the unreleased tapes.

Debates
TVNZ held three party leaders' debates: two between the Prime Minister and the Leader of the Opposition, and one between the leaders of the smaller parties. TV3 hosted a single debate between the Prime Minister and the Leader of the Opposition.

Pre-election coalition preferences
The National Party ruled out working with New Zealand First's Winston Peters after the election. ACT confirmed it would work with National after the elections.

The Labour Party leader Phil Goff ruled out a coalition agreement with Hone Harawira's new Mana Party, but left open the possibility of reaching an agreement with New Zealand First.

In the 16 November minor parties debate, leaders from the minor parties stated their preferences:
 The Green's preference was it would work in a coalition government with Labour, but wouldn't completely rule out working with National.
 Mana would not work in a coalition government with National and/or ACT
 Māori would not work in a coalition government with ACT.
 No preference was stated for New Zealand First, but later said it would not work with National or Labour.
 United Future ruled out working with Labour

Media bias
A Massey University study released in November 2012 suggested newspaper coverage was favourable towards National and John Key. In the month leading up to the election, the big four newspapers in New Zealand – The New Zealand Herald, The Herald on Sunday, The Dominion Post and The Sunday Star-Times – printed 72 percent more photos of Key than his opponent, Phil Goff, and devoted twice as many column inches of text coverage.

Opinion polling

The nature of the Mixed Member Proportional voting system, whereby the share of seats in Parliament a party gets is determined by its share of the nationwide party vote, means aside from normal polling bias and error, opinion polling in New Zealand is fairly accurate in predicting the outcome of an election compared with other countries.

Opinion polls were undertaken periodically since the 2008 election by MediaWorks New Zealand (3 News Reid Research), The New Zealand Herald (Herald Digipoll), Roy Morgan Research, and Television New Zealand (One News Colmar Brunton), with polls having also being conducted by Fairfax Media (Fairfax Media Research International) since July 2011. The graph on the right shows the collated results of all five polls for parties that have polled above the 5% electoral threshold.

After the 2008 election, National gained in popularity, and since 2009 has regularly polled in the 50-55% range, peaking at 55% in August 2009 and October 2011, before falling to 51% in the week before the election. Labour and Green meanwhile kept steady after the election at 31-34% and 7-8% respectively until July 2011, when Labour started to lose support, falling to just 26% before the election. The majority of Labour's loss was the Green's gain, rising to 13% in the same period. No other party peaked on average above 5% in the period.

Results

Parliamentary parties

| colspan=12 align=center| 
|- style="text-align:center;"
! colspan=2 rowspan=2 style="width:213px;" | Party
! Colspan=3 | Party vote
! Colspan=3 | Electorate vote
! Colspan=4 | Seats
|- style="text-align:center;"
! Votes
! %
! Change(pp)
! Votes
! %
! Change(pp)
! List
! Electorate
! Total
! +/-
|-
| 
| 1,058,636
| 47.31
| 2.38
| 1,027,696
| 47.31
| 0.71
| 17
| 42
| 59
| 1
|-
| 
| 614,937
| 27.48
| 6.50
| 762,897
| 35.12
| 0.10
| 12
| 22
| 34
| 9
|-
| 
| 247,372
| 11.06
| 4.33
| 155,492
| 7.16
| 1.53
| 14
| 0
| 14
| 5
|-
| 
| 147,544
| 6.59
| 2.53
| 39,892
| 1.84
| 0.15
| 8
| 0
| 8
| 8
|-
| 
| 31,982
| 1.43
| 0.96
| 39,320
| 1.81
| 1.53
| 0
| 3
| 3
| 2
|-
| 

| 24,168
| 1.08
| new
| 29,872
| 1.38
| new
| 0
| 1
| 1
| new
|-
| 
| 23,889
| 1.07
| 2.58
| 31,001
| 1.43
| 1.56
| 0
| 1
| 1
| 4
|-
| 
| 13,443
| 0.60
| 0.27
| 18,792
| 0.87
| 0.26
| 0
| 1
| 1
| 
|-
| 
| 59,237
| 2.65
| new
| 51,678
| 2.38
| new
| 0
| 0
| 0
| new
|-
| 
| 11,738
| 0.52
| 0.12
| 6,384
| 0.29
| 0.12
| 0
| 0
| 0
| 
|-
| 
| 1,714
| 0.08
| 0.03
| 2,255
| 0.10
| 0.02
| 0
| 0
| 0
| 
|-
|
| 1,595
| 0.07
| 0.02
| 1,459
| 0.07
| 0.01
| 0
| 0
| 0
| 
|-
| 
| 1,209
| 0.05
| 0.03
| 1,245
| 0.06
| 0.02
| 0
| 0
| 0
| 
|-
| style="background-color:#ffffff" |
| style="text-align:left;" |Unregistered parties
| —
| —
| —
| 1,557
| 0.07
| 0.01
| —
| 
| 0
| 
|-
| 
| —
| —
| —
| 2,894
| 0.13
| 0.40
| —
| 
| 0
| 
|-
! colspan=2 style="text-align:left;" | Valid votes
! 2,237,464
! 98.18
! 0.48
! 2,172,434
! 95.32
! 1.47
! Colspan=4 |
|-
| colspan=2 style="text-align:left;" | Informal votes
| 19,872
| 0.87
| 0.37
| 53,332
| 2.34
| 1.27
| Colspan=4 |
|-
| colspan=2 style="text-align:left;" | Disallowed votes
| 21,653
| 0.95
| 0.11
| 53,223
| 2.34
| 0.20
| Colspan=4 |
|-
| colspan=2 style="text-align:left;" | Below electoral threshold
| 75,493
| 3.31
| 
| —
| —
| —
| Colspan=4 |
|-
! colspan=2 style="text-align:left;" | Total
! 2,278,989
! 100
!
! 2,278,989
! 100
!
! 51
! 70
! 121
! 1
|-
| colspan=2 style="text-align:left;" | Eligible voters and Turnout
| 3,070,847
| 74.21
| 5.25
| 3,070,847
| 74.21
| 5.25
| Colspan=4 |
|}

Votes summary

Electorate results

Prior to the election, the National Party held the majority of the electorate seats with 41. Labour held 20 seats, Māori held four seats, and ACT, Mana, Progressive, United Future and an ex-Labour independent held one seat each.

After the election, National gained one seat to hold 42 seats, Labour gained three seats to hold 23 electorates, Māori lost one seat to hold three, and ACT, Mana, and United Future held steady with one seat each. A National or Labour candidate took second place in all the general electorates except Rodney, where it was Conservative Party leader Colin Craig.

In eleven electorates, the incumbents did not seek re-election, and new MPs were elected. In Coromandel, North Shore, Northland, Rangitikei, Rodney and Tāmaki, the seats were passed from incumbent National MPs to new National MPs; in Epsom, the seat was passed from the incumbent ACT MP to the new ACT MP; and in Dunedin North and Manurewa, the seats were passed from incumbent Labour MPs to new Labour MPs. Labour also won Te Atatū from the retiring ex-Labour independent, and Wigram from the retiring Progressive MP.

Of the 59 seats where the incumbent sought re-election, four changed hands. In West Coast-Tasman, Labour's Damien O'Connor regained the seat from National's Chris Auchinvole, who defeated him for the seat in 2008. In Waimakariri, National's Kate Wilkinson defeated Labour MP Clayton Cosgrove, and in Te Tai Tonga, Labour's Rino Tirikatene defeated Maori Party MP Rahui Katene. Christchurch Central on election night ended with incumbent Labour MP Brendon Burns and National's Nicky Wagner tied on 10,493 votes each, and on official counts, swung to Nicky Wagner with a 45-vote majority, increasing to 47 votes on a judicial recount. Despite losing their electorate seats, Chris Auchinvole and Clayton Cosgrove were re-elected into parliament via the party list.

On election night, Waitakere was won by incumbent National MP Paula Bennett with a 349-vote majority over Labour's Carmel Sepuloni. On official counts, it swung to Sepuloni with a majority of 11 votes, and Bennett subsequently requested a judicial recount, and on the recount, the seat swung back to Bennett with a majority of nine votes. Bennett was declared elected, and Sepuloni was not returned via the party list due to her list ranking, being replaced in the Labour caucus with Raymond Huo.

Five electorates returned with the winner having a majority of less than one thousand – Waitakere (9), Christchurch Central (47), Waimakariri (642),  (717) and Tāmaki Makaurau (936).

The table below shows the results of the 2011 general election:

Key:

|-
|colspan=8 style="background-color:#EEEEEE;text-align:center;"| Māori Electorates
|-

|}

Notes

List results

The election was notable for the entry in Parliament of New Zealand's first ever profoundly deaf MP, Mojo Mathers, number 14 on the Green Party's list.

Unsuccessful list candidates

Notes
 These party list members would eventually enter parliament in the term as other list MPs elected resigned from parliament.
 These party list members have since resigned.

Changes in MPs
In total, 25 new MPs were elected to Parliament, and three former MPs returned.

New MPs:
Scott Simpson,
Maggie Barry,
Mike Sabin,
Ian McKelvie,
Mark Mitchell,
Simon O'Connor,
Alfred Ngaro,
Jian Yang,
Paul Goldsmith,
David Clark,
Rino Tirikatene,
Megan Woods,
Andrew Little,
Eugenie Sage,
Jan Logie,
Steffan Browning,
Denise Roche,
Holly Walker,
Julie Anne Genter,
Tracey Martin,
Andrew Williams,
Richard Prosser,
Denis O'Rourke,
Asenati Taylor,
Brendan Horan

Returning MPs:
John Banks,
Winston Peters,
Barbara Stewart

Defeated MPs:
Paul Quinn,
Steve Chadwick,
Stuart Nash,
Carmel Sepuloni,
Rick Barker,
Rahui Katene

Defeated MPs who later returned during the 50th Parliament
Aaron Gilmore,
Carol Beaumont,
Kelvin Davis

Election expenses

The Electoral Commission released party electoral expense returns on 21 March 2012, stating how much each party spent on campaigning between 26 August and 25 November 2011. Candidate only expenses were excluded.

Of note in the party expenses was the $1.88 million spent by the Conservative Party, spending more than but gaining less than one-tenth of the votes of the Labour Party. Translated into dollars spent per party vote gained, the Conservatives spent $31.71 per vote, compared to Labour's $2.91 and National's $2.19.

Post-election events

Changes in party leadership
For the ACT party the mediocre election results on 26 November 2011 (1.1% of the party vote, with no list MPs, 1 electorate MP) resulted in Don Brash tendering his resignation as leader, stating that he took full responsibility for the party's poor performance.

On 29 November the leader of the Labour party Phil Goff and the deputy leader Annette King tendered their resignations to a meeting of the caucus, effective on Tuesday 13 December 2011. After a fortnight-long leadership campaign and election, David Shearer, with deputy Grant Robertson, won Labour caucus support over the ticket of David Cunliffe and Nanaia Mahuta.

References

Further reading

External links

Election broadcast
 
 
 
 
 
 
 Election 2011, Coverage from 3 News

 
November 2011 events in New Zealand